"War" is a counterculture era soul song written by Norman Whitfield and Barrett Strong for the Motown label in 1969. Whitfield first produced the song – an obvious anti–Vietnam War statement – with The Temptations as the original vocalists. After Motown began receiving repeated requests to release "War" as a single, Whitfield re-recorded the song with Edwin Starr as the vocalist, with the label deciding to withhold the Temptations' version from single release so as not to alienate their more conservative fans. Starr's version of "War" was a No. 1 hit on the Billboard Hot 100 chart in 1970, and is not only the most successful and well-known record of his career, but it is also one of the most popular protest songs ever recorded. It was one of 161 songs on the no-play list  issued by Clear Channel following the events of September 11, 2001.

Temptations' version and initial release
The Temptations' version of "War", featuring Paul Williams and Dennis Edwards on lead vocals, was less intense than the Edwin Starr version and begins with marching band drums a la the 20th Century Fox logo. Williams and Edwards deliver the song's anti-war, pro-peace message over a stripped-down instrumental track, with bass singer Melvin Franklin chanting a repeated recruit training-like "hup, two, three, four" in the background during the verses.

The song was included as a track on the March 1970 Psychedelic Shack album, which featured the title track as its only single. The track's direct message, summarized by its chorus ("War, what is it good for? Absolutely nothin'!"), struck a chord with the American public and resonated with growing public opposition to the war in Vietnam. Fans from across the country, many of them college students and other young people, sent letters to Motown requesting the release of "War" as a single. The label did not want to risk the image of its most popular male group, and the Temptations themselves were also apprehensive about releasing such a potentially controversial song as a single. The label decided not to release "War" as a single, a decision that Whitfield fought until the label came up with a compromise: "War" would be released, but it would have to be re-recorded with a different act.

Edwin Starr version

Edwin Starr, who had become a Motown artist in 1968 after his former label, Ric-Tic, was purchased by Motown founder Berry Gordy, became "War's" new vocalist. Considered among Motown's "second-string" acts, Starr had only one major hit, 1968's No. 6 hit "Twenty-Five Miles", to his name by this time. He heard about the conflict surrounding the debate of whether or not to release "War", and volunteered to re-record it. Whitfield re-created the song to match Starr's James Brown-influenced soul shout: the single version of "War" was dramatic and intense, depicting the general anger and distaste the anti-war movement felt towards the war in Vietnam. Unlike the Temptations' original, Starr's "War" was a full-scale Whitfield production, with prominent electric guitar lines, clavinets, a heavily syncopated rhythm accented by a  horn section, and with The Originals and Whitfield's new act The Undisputed Truth on backing vocals.

Upon its release in June 1970, Starr's "War" became a runaway hit, and held the No. 1 position on the Billboard Pop Singles chart for three weeks, in August and September 1970. It replaced "Make It With You" by Bread, and was itself taken out of the spot by another Motown single, "Ain't No Mountain High Enough" by Diana Ross. Billboard ranked it as the No. 5 song of 1970.

Notable as the most successful protest song to become a pop hit, earning compliments from contemporary protester John Lennon, "War" became Edwin Starr's signature song. Rather than hindering his career (as it might have done for the Temptations), "War" buoyed Starr's career, and he adopted the image of an outspoken liberal orator for many of his other early-1970s releases, including the similarly themed "Stop the War Now" from 1971. It and another 1971 single, "Funky Music Sho' 'Nuff Turns Me On", continued Starr's string of Whitfield-produced psychedelic soul hits. After 1971, Starr's career began to falter, and, citing Motown's reliance on formulas, he departed the label in the mid-1970s. Edwin Starr re-recorded the song in 1992 produced by Simon Harris.

Later in his career, after moving to the United Kingdom, Starr re-recorded several of his hits with British band Utah Saints. Starr's new version of "War" in 2003 was his final piece. He died on April 2 of the same year of a heart attack.

Starr earned a Grammy nomination in 1971 for "War" for best R&B Male Vocal. In 1999, Starr's recording of the song was inducted into the Grammy Hall of Fame.

Starr's version of the song was used as the basis for a cover version by Ugly Rumours, a group formed by Tony Blair while at university. The song was released by the Stop the War Coalition and credited to Ugly Rumours, with the band being fronted by a lookalike of Blair. It peaked at number 21 on the UK Singles Chart in March 2007.

Charts

Weekly charts

Year-end charts

Certifications

Later covers
The song's power was reasserted when Bruce Springsteen and the E Street Band took their rendition into the U.S. Top 10 in 1986. It was also covered and released as a single by Frankie Goes to Hollywood in 1984.

Frankie Goes to Hollywood version

Frankie Goes to Hollywood followed their debut 1983 UK number one single Relax with Two Tribes.  The principal B-side for 12-inch single was a cover version of "War".   To build on the chart success of "Two Tribes", "War" became the subject of an accomplished extended remix in its own right (subtitled "Hidden") for the third version of single's UK 12-inch.  For the release "War" was promoted as a double-A-side with the "Carnage" mix of "Two Tribes" on the reverse.   The 12-inch double-A-side single was released in standard and picture disc versions, both with the ZTT Records catalog number WARTZ 3.

Versions of both "Two Tribes" and "War" would later appear on the group's 1984 debut album Welcome to the Pleasuredome as well as numerous Frankie Goes to Hollywood and ZTT Records compilation albums.

The release of "War" / "Two Tribes" also coincided with an extensive and iconic T-shirt marketing campaign for the band during the summer of 1984, featuring such slogans as "Frankie Say WAR! Hide Yourself", as pictured on the 12" single cover.

Several lines of spoken dialogue were added to the Temptations/Edwin Starr version of the song. Impressionist Chris Barrie voiced the long soliloquy about war and love, while impersonating the American President Ronald Reagan; a role he would later reprise in the hit UK TV Show Spitting Image. Born in Germany, Barrie translated and subversively quoted Adolf Hitler from his failed 1924 putsch trial, in the first new lines added to the song.

Bruce Springsteen version

"War" was performed in concert by Bruce Springsteen and the E Street Band in 1985, added to the set list for the final few shows of their lengthy Born in the U.S.A. Tour. Springsteen and his manager Jon Landau were looking for a way to make these concluding shows, taking place at the Los Angeles Memorial Coliseum, a little different and special, and Landau suggested playing "War". A year earlier, he had suggested the same, as a loose protest against Reagan Administration foreign policy in Central America and elsewhere, but the band had been unable to come up with an effective arrangement. This time, however, they did. Springsteen taped the words of the song to his arm, prefaced the song with a spoken admonition not to blindly trust the government, leaders or anything else, and then he and the band performed a rock rendition.

Springsteen released the September 30, 1985 performance as a part of his 1986 box set, Live/1975–85.  "War" was chosen as the first single from the set, and it was again a big hit, reaching No. 8 on the Billboard Hot 100 chart. The music video for the single was a straight concert filming of the same performance.

Springsteen continued to perform "War" regularly through his 1988 Tunnel of Love Express and Human Rights Now! Tours.  He then retired it for 11 years until a one-off guest spot by Edwin Starr during the Reunion Tour. Springsteen brought the song back for six performances on his 2003 Rising Tour before and in the early days of the Iraq War. Springsteen hasn't, to date, performed the song since 2003.

Charts

Other versions
 The Jam released a version of "War" as one of the b-sides to their 1982 single "Just Who Is the 5 O'Clock Hero?". That version is available as a bonus track on reissues of their 1982 album The Gift.
 Also in 1982, Vancouver punk band D.O.A. released a version of "War" as the title track of their EP War on 45.
 In 1998, Bone Thugs-n-Harmony made a song with the same name (featuring Henry Rollins, Tom Morello, and Flea) that interpolates Edwin Starr's chorus.
 For the second season of the legal drama Family Law, a cover of the song by The Brink was used before reverting to using the original Edwin Starr version for its third and final season much like it had utilized in the first season.
 In the 2010 film adaptation of Gulliver's Travels, the song is adapted as a musical production within the movie, with Jack Black singing the lead, and key lines sung by supporting vocalists including Amanda Peet, Billy Connolly, and Emily Blunt.
 Rock band Black Stone Cherry covered "War" on its 2016 album Kentucky.
The Edwin Starr version was used in the first and third films of the Rush Hour Trilogy.
In 1992, Edwin recorded a new version produced by Simon Harris.

Personnel

Edwin Starr version
 Edwin Starr – lead vocals
 The Originals (Freddie Gorman, Walter Gaines, Hank Dixon, C.P. Spencer) and The Undisputed Truth (Joe Harris, Billie Rae Calvin, Brenda Joyce Evans) – background vocals
 The Funk Brothers – instrumentation

Temptations version
 Paul Williams and Dennis Edwards – lead vocals
 Dennis Edwards, Melvin Franklin, Paul Williams, Eddie Kendricks, and Otis Williams – background vocals
 The Funk Brothers – instrumentation

Frankie Goes to Hollywood version
 Holly Johnson – lead vocals
 Paul Rutherford – backing vocals
 Brian Nash – guitar
 Mark O'Toole – bass
 Peter Gill – drums
 Trevor Horn – producer
 Stuart Bruce, Steve Lipson – engineers
 Ian Cooper – mastering

Bruce Springsteen version
 Bruce Springsteen – lead vocals
 The E Street Band (Roy Bittan, Clarence Clemons, Danny Federici, Nils Lofgren, Patti Scialfa, Garry Tallent) – background vocals
 The E Street Band – instrumentation

See also
 List of anti-war songs

References

External links
 Edwin Starr, "War" – Superseventies.com
 Edwin Starr interview by Pete Lewis, 'Blues & Soul' 10/92
 Andrew Hamilton, All Music Guide review
 List of cover versions of "War" at SecondHandSongs.com
 

1970 songs
1970 singles
1986 singles
Anti-war songs
Billboard Hot 100 number-one singles
Bruce Springsteen songs
Cashbox number-one singles
Columbia Records singles
Edwin Starr songs
Funk songs
Grammy Hall of Fame Award recipients
Motown singles
Gordy Records singles
ZTT Records singles
Island Records singles
Psychedelic soul songs
Song recordings produced by Norman Whitfield
Songs of the Vietnam War
Songs written by Barrett Strong
Songs written by Norman Whitfield
The Temptations songs
RPM Top Singles number-one singles